Brigadier Sir Nils Olav III is a king penguin who resides in Edinburgh Zoo, Scotland. He is the mascot and colonel-in-chief of the Norwegian King's Guard. The name 'Nils Olav' and associated ranks have been passed down through three king penguins since 1972 – the current holder being Nils Olav III.

Role in the military
The family of Norwegian shipping magnate Christian Salvesen gave a king penguin to Edinburgh Zoo when the zoo opened in 1913.

When the Norwegian King's Guard visited the Edinburgh Military Tattoo of 1961 for a drill display, a lieutenant named Nils Egelien became interested in the zoo's penguin colony. When the King's Guard returned to Edinburgh in 1972, Egelien arranged for the regiment to adopt a penguin. This penguin was named Nils Olav in honour of Nils Egelien and King Olav V of Norway.

Nils Olav was initially given the rank of visekorporal (lance corporal) in the regiment. He has been promoted each time the King's Guard has returned to the zoo. In 1982 he was made a corporal, and promoted to sergeant in 1987. Nils Olav I died shortly after his promotion to sergeant in 1987, and his place was taken by Nils Olav II, a two-year-old near-double. He was promoted in 1993 to the rank of regimental sergeant major and in 2001 promoted to 'honourable regimental sergeant major'. On 18 August 2005, he was appointed as colonel-in-chief of the same regiment. During the 2005 visit, a  bronze statue of Nils Olav was presented to Edinburgh Zoo. The statue's inscription includes references to both the King's Guard and to the Military Tattoo. A statue also stands at the King's Guard compound at Huseby, Oslo.

The next honour was a knighthood, awarded during a visit by soldiers from the Norwegian King's Guard on 15 August 2008. The knighthood was approved by King Harald V and Nils was the first penguin to receive such an honour in the Norwegian Army. During the ceremony a crowd of several hundred people watched the 130 guardsmen on parade at the zoo, and a citation from the King was read out, which described Nils as a penguin "in every way qualified to receive the honour and dignity of knighthood".

A third penguin, Nils Olav III, took over at some point between 2008 and 2016. On 22 August 2016 he was promoted to brigadier in a ceremony attended by over 50 members of the King's Guard. Nils Olav now outranks Nils Egelien.

See also
William Windsor (goat)
Wojtek (bear)
Foo Foo (dog)
List of individual birds

References

External links

BBC News on his knighthood
BBC News
Scotsman
Article with pictures 

Edinburgh Zoo
Individual penguins
Norwegian knights
Bird mascots
Army mascots
Military animals
Norwegian Army personnel
Individual animals in Scotland
Organization mascots
Scottish mascots
1972 establishments in Scotland
1972 in Norway
Mascots introduced in 1972
Military of Scotland
Norway–Scotland relations
Hans Majestet Kongens Garde